St Mary Magdalene's Church, Walkeringham is a Grade I listed parish church in the Church of England in Walkeringham, Nottinghamshire, England.

History

The church dates from the 13th century.

It is part of a joint parish with:
All Saints' Church, Beckingham
All Saints' Church, Misterton
St Mary the Virgin's Church, West Stockwith

References

Church of England church buildings in Nottinghamshire
Grade I listed churches in Nottinghamshire
13th-century church buildings in England